Jan-Michael Gambill and Scott Humphries were the defending champions but they competed with different partners that year, Gambill with Jonathan Stark and Humphries with Justin Gimelstob.

Gimelstob and Humphries lost in the quarterfinals to Simon Aspelin and Johan Landsberg.

Gambill and Stark lost in the final 6–3, 7–6(7–4) against Mark Knowles and Brian MacPhie.

Seeds
Champion seeds are indicated in bold text while text in italics indicates the round in which those seeds were eliminated.

 Sébastien Lareau /  Alex O'Brien (quarterfinals)
 Justin Gimelstob /  Scott Humphries (quarterfinals)
 Neville Godwin /  Rick Leach (quarterfinals)
 Mark Knowles /  Brian MacPhie (champions)

Draw

External links
 2001 Sybase Open Doubles draw

SAP Open
2001 ATP Tour